The Chem-E-Car Competition is an annual college competition for students majoring in Chemical Engineering. 

According to the competition's official rules, students must design small-scale automobiles that operate by chemical means, along with a poster describing their research. During the competition, they must drive their car a fixed distance (judged on how close the car is to the finish line) down a wedge-shaped course in order to demonstrate its capabilities. The exact distance (15-30 meters) and payload is revealed to the participants one hour before the competition. The size of designed cars cannot exceed certain specifications and cars must operate using "green" methods, which do not release any pollution or waste in the form of a visible liquid or gas, such as exhaust. The dimensions of the car are to be within 20x30x40 cm. This competition is hosted in the United States by the AIChE (American Institute of Chemical Engineers), and winners of the competitions receive various awards, depending on how they placed.

Awards

Regional Competition Awards (funded by AIChE)

Poster Competition
Ribbons for 1st, 2nd, and 3rd place   
Ribbon for Most Creative Drive System   
Ribbon for Most Creative Vehicle Design  

Performance Competition
1st place: $200 and Ribbon   
2nd place: $100 and Ribbon   
3rd place: Honorable mention and Ribbon   
Ribbons for 4th and 5th place finishers   
Ribbon for Spirit of Competition

National Competition Awards (funded by Chevron)

 1st place: $2,000 and a trophy.
 2nd place: $1,000 and a trophy.
 3rd place: $500 and a trophy.
 Best Use of a Biological Reaction to Power a Car - $1,000 Prize: Sponsored by the Society for Biological Engineering 
 SAChE Safety Award for the best application of the principles of chemical process safety to the Chem-E-Car competition. 
 Most Consistent Performance - This award is based on the best average score for the two runs that the vehicle makes. It has been created to recognize the team that has designed and most understands the performance of the reaction that powers the vehicle. Award consists of a plaque. 
 Spirit of the Competition - This award is given to the team displaying the most team spirit as decided by a panel of judges. Award consists of a plaque. 
 Most Creative Drive System - Recognition is awarded to the team that has designed and installed the most creative propulsion system. The winner is decided by a panel of judges during the poster competition. Award consists of a plaque. 
 Golden Tire Award - In 2002, Northeastern University team members created this award to recognize the team with the most creative vehicle design. The national committee has adopted this as an annual award. The winning entry is decided by a ballot cast by each team entered in the competition. Award consists of a plaque.

Past National Performance Competition Winners
2022 - Red Rocket
2021 - University of Toledo
2020 - Virginia Tech
2019 - Virginia Tech
2018 - Georgia Institute of Technology
2017 - Institut Teknologi Sepuluh Nopember
2016 - Korea Advanced Institute of Science and Technology (KAIST)
2015 – Cornell University and McGill University (tie)
2014 - University of Utah
2013 - University of Tulsa
2012 – Cornell University
2011 – University of Puerto Rico at Mayagüez
2010 – Cornell University
2009 – Northeastern University
2008 – Cornell University
2007 – Cooper Union
2006 – University of Puerto Rico at Mayagüez
2005 – Tennessee Tech University
2004 – University of Tulsa
2003 – University of Dayton
2002 – University of Kentucky, Paducah
2001 – Colorado State University
2000 – University of Akron
1999 – University of Michigan

Rules
The competition has various rules:
 The only energy source for the propulsion of the car is a chemical reaction. No liquid discharge is allowed. No obnoxious odor discharge is allowed.
 No commercial batteries are allowed as the power source.
 The stopping mechanism has to be controlled by a chemical reaction. No brakes, mechanical or electronic timing devices are allowed.
 All components of the car must fit into a box of dimensions no larger than 40 cm x 30 cm x 20 cm (shoebox-sized). The car may be disassembled to meet this requirement.
 The cost of the contents of the "shoe box" and the chemicals must not exceed $2,000. The vehicle cost includes the donated cost of any equipment. The time donated by university machine shops and other personnel will not be included in the total price of the car. It is expected that every university has equal access to these resources. The cost of pressure testing is also not included in the capital cost of the car.

Poster
Each car is required to have a poster board explaining how the car runs (power source), some of its specific features, and how it is environmentally friendly. Judges score these posters on four different things: the description of the chemical reaction and power source (20%), the creativity of the design and its unique features (20%), environment and safety features (40%), and the overall quality of the poster, along with the team's presentation (20%). Only posters judged with a score of 70% or above may move on to the performance competition.

Example reactions
Some ideas for chemical reactions have been using pressurized air (creating oxygen through a chemical reaction and allowing it to build pressure) or using electricity created by the dissolving of metals in certain acids (basic battery). One pedantic idea by Cooper Union was to use a fuel cell (a cell that converts fuel to electricity via an electrochemical reaction) to power their car. 

Winners in this competition are not determined by whether their car is faster or more powerful, but how accurate their chemical reaction to stop their vehicle is. This is quite difficult, especially when the distance the car has to travel is unknown until the day of the competition. So teams must find a method that is flexible enough to fit a range of distances, and reliable enough so it does not fail with real world variables (temperature, humidity, track roughness, changes in elevation, etc.). Winners in the past have had a variety of ways of dealing with this problem, such as an iodine clock reaction. This reaction works by using two clear solutions (many variations) that change color after a time delay (the exact time can be found experimentally). When applied to the car, the team used a simple image sensor that could tell when the solutions changed color, at which point the cars power would shut off by cutting the circuit. While the process itself is somewhat simple, accounting for the unknown variables like the payload and distance is quite difficult.

References

External links 
 
 https://www.aiche.org/topics/students/chem-e-car

Science competitions